The Taranaki Airs are a New Zealand basketball team based in New Plymouth. The Airs compete in the National Basketball League (NBL) and play their home games at TSB Stadium. For sponsorship reasons, they are known as the Steelformers Airs.

Team history
A New Plymouth team played in the inaugural season of the Conference Basketball League (CBL) in 1981 and earned runners-up honours. The team went on to finish as runners-up in the CBL Northern Conference in 1983, before winning the CBL championship in 1984.

The team was promoted to the National Basketball League (NBL) for the 1985 season. In 1992, New Plymouth were crowned regular season winners for the first time. In 1994, the team was rebranded as Taranaki. Following the 1999 season, the franchise withdrew from the NBL.

In 2001, a Taranaki team known as the Stormers were the winners of the CBL Central Conference. The following year, the Stormers were once again winners of the CBL Central Conference, earning an 18–0 season record before going on to win the CBL championship with an 85–81 victory over the Kaikoura Whale Riders in the final led by point guard Willie Banks and import forward Link Abrams.

In 2003, Taranaki's bid for renewed NBL status was successful, re-entering the top-flight league as the Mountainairs. In 2009 and 2015, the team had winless seasons. They won just 10 of 54 games between 2017 and 2019.

In September 2019, it was revealed that the team had significant debt that could cause them to withdraw from the 2020 NBL season. The following month, naming rights partner Steelformers stepped in to save the team from collapse.

In December 2021, the team name was changed from Mountainairs to Airs. In 2022, the Airs finished on top of the regular-season standings with a 12–6 record to be crowned minor premiers for just the second time in franchise history and first since 1992.

Current roster

References

External links
 Official team website
 
 Mountain Airs' triple threat
 Taranaki Mountain Airs look to finish NBL season strong

National Basketball League (New Zealand) teams
Basketball teams in New Zealand
Basketball teams established in 1981
1981 establishments in New Zealand
Sport in Taranaki